Terence Dillon (born 8 May 1964) is a male retired British rower. Dillon competed at the 1988 Summer Olympics and the 1992 Summer Olympics. He represented England and won a silver medal in the eight, at the 1986 Commonwealth Games in Edinburgh, Scotland. He competed for Great Britain in the 1993 World Championships.

References

External links
 

1964 births
Living people
British male rowers
Olympic rowers of Great Britain
Rowers at the 1988 Summer Olympics
Rowers at the 1992 Summer Olympics
Commonwealth Games medallists in rowing
Commonwealth Games silver medallists for England
Rowers at the 1986 Commonwealth Games
Medallists at the 1986 Commonwealth Games